Claremont High School is a co-educational, secondary school and sixth form located in Kenton, in the London Borough of Brent, United Kingdom. The headteacher is Ms Nicola Hyde-Boughey. The school has been an academy since 1 April 2011.

School roll
For the school year 2009/10 there were 1,504 pupils on the roll.

History
The school was founded in 1930 by the Middlesex County Council, and was one of a number of new schools built by the council between the wars in the rapidly developing outer suburbs of London. Claremont is now a multi-specialist school. In 2001, it was designated a specialist school in performing arts. In 2006, it was designated as having a second specialism in maths and computing. In 2012, the school gained academy status, joining many other local schools. In 2017 Claremont became part of a multi-academy trust called Chrysalis Multi-Academy Trust, or CMAT.

Alumni

Former England and Manchester City manager Stuart Pearce attended Claremont High School in the 1970s.

References

External links
Claremont High School

Academies in the London Borough of Brent
Kenton, London
Secondary schools in the London Borough of Brent
Training schools in England
Educational institutions established in 1930
1930 establishments in England